Osman Zolan (born 10 December 1966, Tavas) is a Turkish politician and lawyer who is the current Denizli Metropolitan Municipality of Turkey.

On 10 March 2011, Nihat Zeybekci resigned to run for a seat in the parliament. Then Zolan took it over from him. He was nominated as a candidate for 2014 Turkish local elections. After the elections, he was elected mayor of Denizli Metropolitan Municipality.

References

Living people
1964 births
People from Tavas
Dokuz Eylül University alumni
20th-century Turkish lawyers
Mayors of Denizli
Justice and Development Party (Turkey) politicians
21st-century Turkish politicians